Rhys Dowling (born 25 March 1995 in Darwin) is an Australian professional squash player. As of February 2018, he was ranked number 93 in the world.

References

1995 births
Living people
Australian male squash players
Competitors at the 2017 World Games
Competitors at the 2022 World Games